Events of 2019 in Myanmar xxx

Incumbents 
 President: Win Myint 
 State Counsellor: Aung San Suu Kyi
 First Vice President: Myint Swe 
 Second Vice President: Henry Van Thio

Events 
22 April: April 2019 Hpakant jade mine collapse
22 August: A United Nations report charges that sexual violence carried out by security forces against the Muslim Rohingya minority is widespread and severe, and it demonstrates intent to commit genocide and warrants prosecution for war crimes.

Deaths 
 12 January – Taw Phaya, pretender to the throne (b. 1924)

References 

 
Myanmar